Songbook is a career retrospective album released by Canadian singer Gordon Lightfoot on the Rhino label in 1999. The album contains 88 songs on four CDs covering Lightfoot's career, and includes 16 previously unreleased tracks. The only material not covered are the albums Harmony and Solo, which were released after Songbook.

Track listing
All compositions by Gordon Lightfoot.

Disc 1
 (Remember Me) I'm the One**
 It's Too Late, He Wins**
 For Lovin' Me
 Early Morning Rain
 The Way I Feel
 Steel Rail Blues
 A Message to the Wind*
 Song For a Winter's Night
 Canadian Railroad Trilogy
 Go-Go Round
 Crossroads
 You'll Still Be Needing Me*
 The Mountains And Maryann
 The Last Time I Saw Her
 Did She Mention My Name
 Pussywillows Cat-Tails
 Boss Man
 Something Very Special
 Bitter Green
 Affair on Eighth Avenue
 I'm Not Sayin'/Ribbon of Darkness
 Softly
 Mama Said*
 Station Master*

Disc 2
 Sit Down Young Stranger
 If You Could Read My Mind
 Poor Little Allison
 The Pony Man
 Cobwebs And Dust
 Too Much to Lose*
 Summer Side of Life
 Cotton Jenny
 Ten Degrees And Getting Colder
 Nous Vivons Ensemble
 Same Old Loverman
 Heaven Don't Deserve Me*
 Don Quixote
 Alberta Bound
 Beautiful
 Ode to Big Blue
 Stone Cold Sober*
 Old Dan's Records
 That Same Old Obsession
 Lazy Morning
 Hi'way Songs
 Can't Depend on Love

Disc 3
 Sundown
 Carefree Highway
 Seven Island Suite
 Borderstone*
 Cold on the Shoulder
 Now and Then
 Rainy Day People
 Fine as Fine Can Be
 All the Lovely Ladies
 Summertime Dream
 The Wreck of the Edmund Fitzgerald
 Never Too Close
 Betty Called Me In*
 Endless Wire
 The Circle is Small
 Sea of Tranquility
 Make Way For the Lady
 Dream Street Rose
 Ghosts of Cape Horn
 Keepin' On Yearnin'*
 Canary Yellow Canoe*

Disc 4
 Shadows
 She's Not the Same
 14 Karat Gold
 Baby Step Back
 In My Fashion
 Never Say Trust Me*
 Why Should I Feel Blue*
 Someone to Believe In
 Romance
 Broken Dreams
 Always on the Bright Side*
 Forgive Me Lord*
 Lifeline*
 East of Midnight
 Morning Glory
 A Lesson In Love
 A Passing Ship
 Waiting For You
 Drink Yer Glasses Empty
 I'll Prove My Love
 A Painter Passing Through

*Indicates previously unreleased track.
**Indicates a track that was previously only available on a 45 RPM vinyl single.

Gordon Lightfoot albums
1999 greatest hits albums
Albums produced by Elliot Mazer
Albums produced by John Simon (record producer)
Albums produced by Russ Titelman
Albums produced by Lenny Waronker
Albums produced by Joe Wissert
Rhino Records compilation albums